The Taipō River is a river of the northern West Coast Region of New Zealand's South Island. It flows east from its sources at Mount Zetland, fed by many streams draining the north side of the Allen Range to reach the Karamea River 25 kilometres southeast of Karamea.

The Wangapeka Track follows the left bank of the Taipō River for almost its entire length, having crossed the Little Wanganui Saddle. The Taipo hut is located midway down the valley.

References

Rivers of the West Coast, New Zealand
Rivers of New Zealand